Britt is a city in Hancock County, Iowa, United States, and is the home of the National Hobo Convention and the Hobo Museum. The population was 2,044 at the 2020 census.

History
A train depot was built at Britt in 1870, with tracks running from east to west through the town. The first train line running through the town was the Chicago, Milwaukee & St. Paul line, followed by the Iowa, Chicago and Eastern line. As of 2019, the Canadian Pacific Railway runs through the town, mostly carrying grain.

Britt was platted in 1878. It is believed to be named for a railroad engineer or brakeman. Britt was incorporated as a city on June 23, 1881.

Hobos have convened in Britt since 1900 for the National Hobo Convention, which celebrates the history of hobos and their way of life through contests, craft shows, communal eating, and a parade.

Geography
Britt is located at  (43.096363, -93.801234).

Climate

According to the Köppen Climate Classification system, Britt has a hot-summer humid continental climate, abbreviated "Dfa" on climate maps.

Demographics

2010 census
As of the census of 2010, there were 2,069 people, 886 households, and 547 families living in the city. The racial makeup of the city was 93.1% White, 0.3% African American, 0.1% Native American, 0.6% Asian, 4.5% from other races, and 1.3% from two or more races. Hispanic or Latino of any race were 7.7% of the population.

There were 886 households, of which 28.1% had children under the age of 18 living with them, 50.9% were married couples living together, 7.9% had a female householder with no husband present, 2.9% had a male householder with no wife present, and 38.3% were non-families. 35.1% of all households were made up of individuals, and 19.1% had someone living alone who was 65 years of age or older. The average household size was 2.27 and the average family size was 2.94.

The median age in the city was 43.7 years. 24.6% of residents were under the age of 18; 4.7% were between the ages of 18 and 24; 22% were from 25 to 44; 24.7% were from 45 to 64; and 24% were 65 years of age or older. The gender makeup of the city was 46.5% male and 53.5% female.

2000 census
As of the census of 2000, there were 2,052 people, 873 households, and 552 families living in the city. The racial makeup of the city was 94.7% White, 0.1% Native American, 0.2% Asian, 4.8% from other races, and 0.2% from two or more races. Hispanic or Latino of any race were 5.8% of the population.

There were 873 households, out of which 28.1% had children under the age of 18 living with them, 53.4% were married couples living together, 7.0% had a female householder with no husband present, and 36.7% were non-families. 34.1% of all households were made up of individuals, and 19.0% had someone living alone who was 65 years of age or older. The average household size was 2.28 and the average family size was 2.93.

In the city, the population was spread out, with 24.3% under the age of 18, 6.3% from 18 to 24, 23.4% from 25 to 44, 21.2% from 45 to 64, and 24.8% who were 65 years of age or older. The median age was 42 years. For every 100 females, there were 88.1 males. For every 100 females age 18 and over, there were 83.1 males.

The median income for a household in the city was $33,150, and the median income for a family was $41,495. Males had a median income of $28,027 versus $20,611 for females. The per capita income for the city was $16,130. About 5.7% of families and 8.2% of the population were below the poverty line, including 10.2% of those under age 18 and 9.5% of those age 65 or over.

Education
West Hancock Community School District operates public schools in Britt. The district formed on July 1, 1994 with the merger of the Britt and Kanawha districts.

In popular culture

Britt is mentioned as being the location of a prom in the song "Prom Night" by The Perfect Theory, written by Adam Young of Owl City fame.

References

External links 

 
 City of Britt, Iowa Website Portal style website, Government, Business, Library, Recreation and more

Cities in Iowa
Cities in Hancock County, Iowa
1878 establishments in Iowa
Populated places established in 1878